The United Andhra Pradesh Legislative Assembly election of 2009 took place in April 2009, concurrently with the 2009 Indian general election. The elections were held in the state in the first phase (2009-04-16) and the second phase (2009-04-23). The results were declared on 2009-05-16. The incumbent Indian National Congress retained power in the United Andhra Pradesh State Assembly lower house, though with a reduced majority. The Congress Legislature party re-elected incumbent Chief minister Y. S. Rajasekhara Reddy as its leader thus re-nominating him to the post.

Previous Assembly 
In the 2004 Andhra Pradesh Assembly election, Congress had swept the state, winning 185 of the 294 seats in the Assembly. The Congress' pre-poll alliance partners Left Front and Telangana Rashtra Samithi (TRS) also did well, winning 15 and 26 seats respectively, taking the United Progressive Alliance (UPA) tally to 226. As the leader of the Congress Legislature Party, Y. S. Rajasekhara Reddy was invited to form the Government by Governor Surjit Singh Barnala.

As expected, the Government lasted the full term of 5 years and the tenure of the Legislative Assembly was due to expire on 30 May 2009. The Election Commission of India (ECI) decided to hold the Assembly elections along with the general election. The election in each Assembly constituency (AC) was held in the same phase as the election to the corresponding Parliamentary constituency that the AC falls under.

Background 
After the 2008 Lok Sabha vote of confidence, the Left Front withdrew support to the Congress in the state as well. Telugu Desam Party (TDP) and TRS then joined the Left as part of the national Third Front. In Andhra Pradesh, this alliance called themselves the "Grand Alliance" against what they called the "corrupt Congress" and "communal BJP".

However, after the elections in Andhra Pradesh were completed, but before the counting of votes, TRS switched allegiance to the NDA.

Schedule

Results

Results by party

Results by district

Results by constituency

Government formation 
Despite losing their alliance partner after voting and fighting anti-incumbency in the state, Congress managed to get the majority in the 294-member Assembly with 157 seats. Analysis of the results showed that the split of the anti-Congress votes between the Grand Alliance and actor-turned-politician Chiranjeevi's newly formed Praja Rajyam Party (PRP) helped increase the Congress overall seat count.

The incumbent Chief Minister Y. S. Rajasekhara Reddy was sworn in for a second term on 20 May 2009. His council of 35 ministers were sworn in by Governor N. D. Tiwari a few days later on 25 May 2009.

See also
State Assembly elections in India, 2009
Indian general election in Andhra Pradesh, 2009
List of constituencies of the Assembly of Andhra Pradesh

References 

State Assembly elections in Andhra Pradesh
2000s in Andhra Pradesh
2009 State Assembly elections in India